Rank comparison chart of all navies of Post-Soviet states.

Officers (OF 1–10)

References

See also
Comparative navy officer ranks of Asia
Comparative navy officer ranks of Europe

Military comparisons